Jón Magnússon (16 January 1859 – 23 June 1926) was an Icelandic politician, and was prime minister of Iceland on two occasions. He served his first term, as a member of the Home Rule Party (Heimastjórnarflokkurinn), from 4 January 1917 to 7 March 1922. He served his second term, as a member of the Conservative Party (Íhaldsflokkurinn, a forerunner of the Independence Party), from 22 March 1924 to 23 June 1926. He served as speaker of the Althing from 1913 to 1914.

Death
In June 1926, Jón traveled with King Christian X to Seyðisfjörður aboard the HDMS Niels Juel. Following the king's departure back to Denmark on 22 June, Jón traveled with HDMS Gejser to Norðfjörður, where he grew up. On the evening of 23 June, he suddenly collapsed and died while visiting the Jón Guðmundsson, the local priest.

References

External links
Bio on althingi.is

1859 births
1926 deaths
Jón Magnússon
Jón Magnússon
Jón Magnússon
Jón Magnússon